The 2018–19 Kentucky Wildcats men's basketball team represented the University of Kentucky in the 2018–19 NCAA Division I men's basketball season. The team played its home games in Lexington, Kentucky for the 43rd consecutive season at Rupp Arena, with a capacity of 23,500. The Wildcats, led by John Calipari in his 10th season as head coach, played in the Southeastern Conference.

Previous season
The Wildcats finished the 2017–18 season 26–11, 10–8 in SEC play to finish in a three-way tie for fourth. In the SEC tournament, the Wildcats defeated Georgia, Alabama, and Tennessee to win the tournament championship for the 31st time in school history. As a result, the Wildcats received the conference's automatic bid to the NCAA tournament. As the No. 5 seed in the South region, they defeated No. 12 Davidson and No. 13 Buffalo to advance to the Sweet Sixteen. There, they lost to No. 9-seeded Kansas State.

Offseason

Departures
On April 2, 2018, Tai Wynyard announced that he would be transferring from Kentucky. On April 6, Kevin Knox announced that he would declare for the 2018 NBA draft and would hire an agent, forgoing his remaining eligibility. On April 9, Sacha Killeya-Jones announced he would be transferring as well. Also, on April 9, Shai Gilgeous-Alexander announced that he would declare for the draft and would be hiring an agent, foregoing his remaining NCAA eligibility. On April 16, Hamidou Diallo also announced that he would declare for the draft and hire an agent. Three other players announced their entry in the draft, but did not initially hire agents, giving them the option to return to Kentucky. P. J. Washington declared for the draft on April 3, followed by Wenyen Gabriel on April 18 and Jarred Vanderbilt on April 20. On May 30, 2018, the NCAA's final day to announce a return, Washington announced he would return for a sophomore season. Jarred Vanderbilt and Wenyen Gabriel announced on May 30, 2018 that they would remain in the 2018 NBA Draft and forgo their remaining college eligibility.

2018 recruiting class
Immanuel Quickley, from Havre de Grace, Maryland, was the first commitment to Kentucky's 2018 class. He committed to Kentucky on September 22, over offers from Kansas and Miami. He was a consensus five-star prospect and was ranked the consensus No. 12 overall player by the four main recruiting services. The Wildcats' second 2018 commitment was Keldon Johnson, a small forward from South Hill, Virginia, who committed on November 11. Kentucky beat out Maryland, NC State, and Texas for Johnson's signature. He was also a consensus five-star prospect and ranked by ESPN as its No. 7 overall prospect. Tyler Herro was the third commitment for Kentucky's 2018 class. Formerly committed to Wisconsin, Herro committed to Kentucky the week after his official visit. Herro was a consensus four-star prospect and was ranked the No. 4 shooting guard in the 2018 class by ESPN. E.J. Montgomery was the fourth commitment for Kentucky's 2018 class. Formerly committed to Auburn, he re-opened his recruitment after the Auburn staff was implicated in the 2017–18 NCAA Division I men's basketball corruption scandal. Montgomery committed to Kentucky on April 9, 2018. Montgomery was a five-star prospect and was ranked No. 12 in the 2018 class. On April 10, 2018, Ashton Hagans committed to the University of Kentucky over offers from Georgia and North Carolina. Hagans was originally the second commitment in the 2019 recruiting class and the No. 1 ranked point guard in the class of 2019 by 247 sports. On June 15, 2018, Hagans announced that he would be reclassifying into the 2018 class and play for the Cats in the upcoming season, thus making him the fifth recruit in the class of 2018.

Incoming transfers
On June 20, 2018, Reid Travis announced that he would transfer to Kentucky. Travis was a two-time first team All-Pac-12 for Stanford and averaged 19.5 PPG and 8.7 RPG in his final year with the Cardinal. As a grad transfer, he is eligible to play immediately.

Roster

 Roster is subject to change as/if players transfer or leave the program for other reasons.

Depth chart

Schedule and results

|-
!colspan=12 style=| Big Blue Bahamas exhibition trip

|-
|-
!colspan=12 style=| Exhibition

|-
!colspan=12 style=| Regular Season

|-
!colspan=12 style=|SEC Tournament

|-
!colspan=12 style=| NCAA tournament

Rankings

*AP does not release post-NCAA Tournament rankings^Coaches did not release a Week 2 poll.

References

Kentucky
Kentucky Wildcats men's basketball seasons
Kentucky basketball, men, 2018-19
Kentucky basketball, men
Kentucky